Torquigener parcuspinus, commonly known as the yellow-eyed toadfish, is a fish of the pufferfish family Tetraodontidae, native to the eastern Indian Ocean, Indonesia, and northern Australia.

References

External links
 Fishes of Australia : Torquigener parcuspinus

parcuspinus
Marine fish of Northern Australia
yellow-eyed toadfish